Claestorp  is an estate and manor house at Katrineholm municipality in Södermanland, Sweden.

History
The Claestorp estate has a  history dated back as far as 1434. Since 1776, members of  the Lewenhaupt family have owned the estate.
The  manor house built in 1754  according to drawings by Carl Johan Cronstedt  (1709–1779).The manor house was built for  Count Klas Stromberg  (1698-1782) who was in service at the Swedish Royal Court. He was  made chamberlain in 1719, court marshal in 1747 and was promoted to councilor in 1751.

See also
List of castles in Sweden

References

External links
Claestorp website

Manor houses in Sweden
Buildings and structures  in Södermanland County